Awaking from a Dream is a 2008 Spanish drama film written and directed by Freddy Mas Franqueza. It was entered into the 30th Moscow International Film Festival.

Plot
At 8 years of age, Marcel's mother drops him off at her estranged father's house and leaves him there to follow her boyfriend to Germany.  Marcel's grandfather and gives him the love and attention he lacked from his mother.  By the age of 21, Marcel has plans to move out of his grandfather's home and into a house with his girlfriend.  However, by this time his grandfather begins showing symptoms of Alzheimer's and Marcel is faced with the choice of leaving with his girlfriend or staying to care for the only relative that ever truly loved and cared for him.

Cast
 María Almudéver
 Héctor Alterio as Pascual
 Álvaro Báguena
 Aurora Carbonell
 Alberto Ferreiro as Marcel (20 años)
 Aroa Gimeno as Bea
 Mónica López as Alina
 Sergio Padilla as Marcel (niño)
 Oriol Tarrasón

References

External links
 

2008 films
2008 drama films
Spanish drama films
2000s Spanish-language films
2000s Spanish films